Racetraitor is an American hardcore punk band originally from Chicago, Illinois. The band attracted controversy in the late 1990s, before any releases, as a result of their radical take on racial politics, which focused on ideas like systemic racism and white privilege before they were widely discussed topics in popular or underground culture. Racetraitor was also a key proto-metalcore act being one of the first few bands to incorporate extreme metal influences, such as death metal, grindcore, and doom metal, into hardcore.

In 1998, the band released their album Burn the Idol of the White Messiah. The album was followed by a split EP with Indianapolis band Burn It Down called Make Them Talk in 1999 before an initial breakup. The band has reformed as of 2016, releasing two EPs featuring new music and their second album 2042.

Early career
Racetraitor was formed by drummer Karl Hlavinka, guitarist Daniel Binaei, bassist Brent Decker, and vocalist Mani Mostofi, playing powerviolence/grindcore music. Early songs were extremely short and heavily filled with noise. The songs were recorded in a demo that was not publicly released until 2016.

In the early shows, Racetraitor took a more confrontational approach to spreading social justice ideas. The band became known for calling their own audience members "crackers", which the band explained as not a racial category but a term for people who perpetuate racism and exploitation in their day-to-day lives. During a performance in Columbus, Ohio during this period, the band members criticised members of Anti-Racist Action for focusing on white nationalist groups like the Ku Klux Klan rather than systemic issues such as institutional racism, leading to a physical altercation between the groups.

Burn the Idol and Make Them Talk
A year into the band Andy Hurley joined them on drums and Hlavinka began performing as a guitarist. The band noted that when Hurley joined the band they changed sounds to match his technical ability, shifting from a noisy powerviolence band to a style closer to 1990s death metal. Hlavinka soon quit, only to return to the band on and off over the years. In 1997, the band went into Sonic Iguana studios Lafayette Indiana to record their debut. In 1998, Uprising Records released Burn the Idol of the White Messiah. Decker soon left the group, with a number of musicians playing bass in the band temporarily, including Fall Out Boy's Pete Wentz.

After the release of Burn the Idol, the band started touring more extensively, around which time Eric Bartholomae joined the band on guitar. While playing Hellfest in Syracuse New York in 1998, the band struck up a friendship with Josh Grabelle of Trustkill Records who expressed interest in working with them. Racetraitor released a split EP called Make Them Talk on Trustkill with Indianapolis band Burn It Down in 1999 and set off on their first full U.S. tour sharing a number of dates with Zao, Brother's Keeper, and Eighteen Visions. By the year's end, the band broke up.

Post-breakup
After Racetraitor, Hurley played drums in several other projects, including Killtheslavemaster and Project Rocket, and also joined Mostofi in The Kill Pill, who released one record on Uprising before disbanding. Hurley was also a guest drummer on Vegan Reich's Jihad EP. Most notably, Hurley joined Fall Out Boy with Wentz. In 2016, Hurley joined the band SECT with members of Earth Crisis and Burning Love.

Binaei went on to form Arma Angelus with Wentz, which released one full-length album on Eulogy Recordings and an EP on the label Happy Couples Never Last, and Jay Jancetic (Harm's Way), as well as other bands. Hlavinka left Racetraitor in 1997, joining the Pittsburgh band Creation Is Crucifixion, continuing to appear occasionally with Racetraitor until they disbanded in 1999, and playing in other bands.

Bass player Brent Decker works at the University of Illinois at Chicago School of Public Health. Mostofi played in a series of bands and became a lawyer. He now works as an international human rights advocate. Bassist and guitarist Eric Bartholomae now plays guitar in Vegan Reich.

Reunion and 2042
In 2016, Racetraitor announced via Facebook that a new remixed version of Burn the Idol would be re-released on vinyl. In October 2016, the band played its first show in 17 years with Detroit hardcore band Earthmover. In September 2016, the group released two new songs: "By the Time I Get to Pennsylvania" and "Damaged". Hurley attributed the band's reformation to the current political situation. “We had discussed playing a show or doing something else over the years, but nostalgia was never all that motivating, so the idea died,” Hurley explained. “But with everything happening in the past couple of years, from the way things heated up in Ferguson, Missouri, to the rise in xenophobia and bigotry reflected by the popularity of Donald Trump, making new music with Racetraitor felt important again.”

In July 2017, British label Carry the Weight Records released a reissue of Burn the Idol of the White Messiah. The record was remixed by Dallas Thomas from Pelican. The same month, Organized Crime Records released the EP Invisible Battles Against Invisible Fortresses. The band supported the record with shows across the US, including the This is Hardcore festival, and a small European tour with Sect, which included a stop at Fluff Fest in the Czech Republic.

Racetraitor announced their signing to Good Fight Music in October 2018, releasing their second full-length 2042 with lead single "BLK XMAS." 2042 received strong critical acclaim, landing in Vice Magazine's list of 100 Best Albums of 2018. Vice call the record "a barn-burning blast of metallic hardcore fury that screams by with guns blazing and fists held high." The record's title "2042" referred to the year when the US census predicts that white Americans become less than 51 percent of the population. Mostofi explained that "their decision to nab this particular title as a nod to that particular brand of fragile white fear, and a thumbed nose at the inflammatory xenophobic, Islamophobic rhetoric fueling the right wing’s terror."

The second press of the Burn the Idol of the White Messiah reissue was also released on Good Fight in partnership with Bulgarian label Ugly and Proud Records in October 2018.

In February 2020, the band joined Swedish post-hardcore legends Refused on the east coast leg of their US tour. In April, they released a split EP with Neckbeard Deathcamp, Closet Witch, and Haggathorn. After the murder of George Floyd, Racetraitor organized the "Shut It Down" complication with raised over 30,000 dollars for the Movement for Black Lives. The compilation featured 48 well received tracks, including from prominent metal and hardcore acts such as Sunn O))), Primitive Man, Xibalba (band), Minority Threat, Thou, War on Women (band), Misery Signals, Burn, Amygdala, Terminal Nation, Modern Life is War, and more.

In an interview published in June 2021, singer Mani Mostofi announced that the band is working on their final album, postponed by the COVID-19 pandemic.

Message and image
The band attracted controversy in the late 1990s as a result of their radical take on racial politics. As a result of the attention and before releasing any music, Racetraitor was featured on the covers of both Maximumrocknroll and HeartattaCk which were two of the most influential punk and hardcore publications at the time. Their political advocacy centered around anti-racism and anti-colonialism, discussing issues such as white privilege, class privilege, the war on drugs, biases in the US criminal justice system, economic globalization, and US foreign policy. The name of the band is a reappropriation of the pejorative term "race traitor" used by white American racists as a reference to using one's social and economic privilege to pursue social justice. The band's members were vegan and straight edge. After they developed a profile in the U.S. hardcore scene, Racetraitor's communication style became less confrontational. In 1999, Tacoma, Washington metalcore band Botch released the song "C. Thomas Howell as the 'Soul Man'" on their 1999 album We Are the Romans, a critique of Racetraitor's attitude to race politics.

Members

Current members
 Mani Mostofi – lead vocals
 Andrea Black – guitar
 Daniel Binaei – guitar
 Brent Decker – bass
 Andrew Hurley – drums

Former members
 Eric Bartholomae – guitar
 Karl Hlavinka – guitar, bass, drums (initially)
 Pete Wentz – bass
 Rich Miles – bass

Discography
 Burn the Idol of the White  Messiah (Uprising Records, 1998)
 Make Them Talk split EP (Trustkill with vinyl released on Good Life Recordings, 1999)
 By the Time I Get to Pennsylvania EP (Organized Crime Records, 2016)
 Continuing the Tradition Demo (recorded in 1996, released by Contraband Media in 2016)
 Burn the Idol of the White  Messiah: remix and remaster (Carry the Weight Records / Contraband Media, 2017)
 Invisible Battles Against Invisible Fortresses EP (Organized Crime Records, 2017)
 2042 (Good Fight Music, 2018)
 s/t split EP with Neckbeard Deathcamp, Closet Witch, and Haggathorn (To Live a Lie Records, Ugly and Proud Records, Circus of the Macabre Records, and  Moment of Collapse Records, 2020)

References

External links
 Racetraitor at Bandcamp

Musical groups from Illinois
Straight edge groups
Trustkill Records artists
Good Life Recordings artists
Metalcore musical groups from Illinois